Rabbit Ears: TV Poems is an anthology from NYQ Books, edited by Joel Allegretti. Released in 2015, it consists of poems about television and is reportedly the first poetry anthology to cover the subject. It contains 129 poems by 130 poets, including former U.S. Poet Laureate Billy Collins, who suggested the title.

The Boston Globe called Rabbit Ears "cleverly edited" and "a smart exploration of the many, many meanings of TV." Rain Taxi said, "With its diversity of content and poetic form, Rabbit Ears feels more rich and eclectic than any other poetry anthology on the market." The Pittsburgh Post-Gazette included Rabbit Ears in its 2015 holiday gift guide for TV fans, along with books about Breaking Bad and Downton Abbey.

In an interview with The Huffington Post, Allegretti said, "Poets by and large today are educators and scholars. I’m neither. My background is in media relations. My last job was director of media relations for a national not-for-profit organization. I prepared the CEO, his senior executives, and other spokespeople for interviews. I dealt with Nightly Business Report, 60 Minutes, and producers at local TV stations around the country. I’ve been inside TV studios. Had I not had that experience, I probably wouldn’t have conceived an anthology of TV poetry."

Rabbit Ears is in the Fales Collection at New York University and in the archives of the University of Rochester, SUNY Buffalo, the University of Wisconsin, and the Ohio State University.

Contributors:

Austin Alexis	
				
Joel Allegretti					

Aaron Anstett	
				
Quan Barry					

Ellen Bass					

Jeanne Marie Beaumont			 

Martine Bellen				

Aaron Belz				

Emma Bolden				

Charlie Bondhus				

Gayle Brandeis				

Michael Broder				

Kurt Brown					

John F. Buckley and Martin Ott		

Regie Cabico					

Peter Carlaftes					

Susana H. Case				

Guillermo Filice Castro			

Ann Cefola				

Suzanne Cleary				

Billy Collins					

Jeffery Conway				

Nina Corwin				

Steve Dalachinsky			

MaryLisa DeDomenicis			

Cat Dixon					

celeste doaks					

Thom Donovan				

Maggie Dubris				

Alan Feldman					

Monique Ferrell				

Edward Field					

Annie Finch					

Stanford M. Forrester				

John Foy					

Philip Fried					

Jeannine Hall Gailey				

Amy Gerstler					

George Guida					

Marj Hahne					

Raymond P. Hammond			

Penny Harter					

George Held					

Matthew Hittinger				

Tony Hoagland				

Janis Butler Holm				

Amy Holman					

Bob Holman					

Josh Humphrey				

Karla Huston					

Colette Inez					

Luisa Aguilar Igloria				

Ice Gayle Johnson								          		

W. Todd Kaneko				

Vasiliki Katsarou				

Collin Kelley					

Ron Kolm					

Dean Kostos					

Catherine B. Krause				

Peter LaBerge					

Gerry LaFemina				

Erik La Prade					

Dorianne Laux				

David Lawton					

Lynn Levin					

Matthew Lippman				

Timothy Liu					

Chip Livingston				

Diane Lockward				

Roy Lucianna					

Marjorie Maddox				

Gerard Malanga				

Robert Manaster				

Stephen Massimilla				

Chris McCreary				

Lynn McGee					

Kelly McQuain				

David Messineo				

Philip Miller					

Michael Montlack				

Tracie Morris					

Rick Mullin					

Peter E. Murphy				

Joey Nicoletti					

Jacob Oet					

Abiodun Oyewole					

Michael Palma				

Matthew Pennock				

David Phillips					

Patricia Polak	
				
Stephen Roger Powers	

Stella Vinitchi Radulescu			

Bethany Reid					

Steven Riel					

Susanna Rich					

Aram Saroyan					

Jason Schneiderman				

Steven D. Schroeder				

Elaine Sexton				

Ravi Shankar				

Neil Shepard				

Hilary Sideris				 

Hal Sirowitz				

Ellen McGrath Smith			

Rosalind Palermo Stevenson		

Terese Svoboda			

Aldo Tambellini			

Tantra-zawadi				

Mervyn Taylor			

Maria Terrone				

John J. Trause				

Tony Trigilio				

David Trinidad			 

Ryan G. Van Cleave			

Gloria Vando				

Angelo Verga				

David Vincenti			

Diane Wakoski			

George Wallace			

Lewis Warsh				

Estha Weiner				

Lauren Wells				

Marcus Wicker			

George Witte				 

Debbie Yee				

David Yezzi				

Michael T. Young			

Grace Zabriskie			

Bill Zavatsky

References

External links
 http://books.nyq.org/title/rabbit_ears

American poetry anthologies
2015 poetry books